Bonnie & Clyde is a musical with music by Frank Wildhorn, lyrics by Don Black and a book by Ivan Menchell. The world premiere took place in San Diego, CA in November 2009. The musical centers on Bonnie Parker and Clyde Barrow, the ill-fated lovers and outlaws whose story has been infamous since they achieved folk hero status during the Great Depression. Wildhorn described the music as a "non-traditional score, combining rockabilly, blues and gospel music". The San Diego run was followed by a Sarasota, Florida engagement in 2010.

The musical debuted on Broadway in December 2011. It was nominated for three Outer Critics Circle Awards and five Drama Desk Awards, both including Best New Musical, as well as two nominations for the 2012 Tony Awards. Subsequent productions have since been staged internationally following the submission of the work to Music Theater International, including productions in Japan, Korea, UK and Brazil.

Background
Previously, Black and Wildhorn collaborated on Dracula, the Musical, which also had its world premiere in La Jolla. Wildhorn got in touch with Black about the possibility of writing a song cycle based on the story of Bonnie and Clyde. They released a 13-track demo recording (five of which are still in the present musical but altered considerably) for Atlantic Records with Michael Lanning, Rob Evan, Brandi Burkhardt and Linda Eder sharing the principal roles. The music contains elements of country and western, Blues and Broadway pop. In February 2009, the show held an industry-only reading at Roundabout Theatre Company, starring Laura Osnes as Bonnie and Stark Sands as Clyde.

Production history

San Diego (2009)
The musical had its world premiere at the La Jolla Playhouse in San Diego, CA beginning in previews November 10, 2009. Opening night was November 22. The run concluded December 20, after 15 previews and 33 regular performances. Jeff Calhoun helmed and choreographed the production that starred Osnes and Sands, along with Melissa van der Schyff as Blanche and Claybourne Elder as Buck. It won five major San Diego Theatre Critics Circle Awards in 2009.

Sarasota (2010)
Due to a positive response from the San Diego run, the show announced a return engagement for the Asolo Repertory Theatre in Sarasota, Florida. Previews began November 12, 2010, before a November 19 opening. It ran for 8 previews and 36 regular performances through December 19, with Osnes being joined by Jeremy Jordan as Clyde. The production's artistic director Michael Edwards stated, "How it goes here, will determine whether it goes to Broadway".

Broadway (2011)
The success of the Florida production led to the show's Broadway debut in New York City. Previews began on November 4, 2011, at the Gerald Schoenfeld Theatre, with the official opening on December 1, 2011, following the 33 previews. Osnes and Jordan reprised their roles. The producers announced on December 16, 2011, that the show would close on December 30. Originally planned as an open-ended run, it played 36 regular performances. On January 2, 2012, statement, director Calhoun said that he had "never had a show close while it was still playing to audiences like a hit".

Off-West End Workshops (2017)
The musical held a limited Off West-End workshop-style production at The Other Palace Theatre in London in 2017 featuring Jamie Muscato as Clyde Barrow and Evelyn Hoskins as Bonnie Parker. The show opened on June 26, 2017, and closed on July 1, 2017.

West End Concert (2022)
The musical made its West End debut on January 17, 2022, for a set of two concerts at Theatre Royal, Drury Lane which concluded the following day. This production directed by Nick Winston was set to reunite original Broadway stars Jeremy Jordan and Laura Osnes in the roles they originated and in their West End debuts. In November 2021, it was reported that Osnes was replaced by Frances Mayli McCann. The concert production has been filmed for future release. On the day of the second concert, it was announced that a fully staged West End production of Bonnie & Clyde directed by Nick Winston would begin previews at the Arts Theatre on April 9, 2022.

West End Production (2022)
The musical directed by Nick Winston opened at the Arts Theatre on April 9, 2022, and starred George Maguire and Natalie McQueen as Buck and Blanche Barrow. Frances Mayli McCann and Jordan Luke Gage were announced to be playing the titular roles on February 23, 2022 alongside the rest of the cast. It was announced on the 25th October 2022 that the production would re-open at the Garrick Theatre on March 4, 2023, and on the 7th November 2022 that Frances Mayli McCann and Jordan Luke Gage would reprise their roles as Bonnie and Clyde.

International and amateur productions

A Japanese language production played the Aoyama Theatre in Tokyo, Japan from fall 2011 until January 22, 2012, with Megumi Hamada as Bonnie, Mario Tashiro as Clyde, Koki Okada as Buck, and Yuri Shirahane as Blanche. It was directed by Tetsu Taoshita.
The first Korean language staging in Seoul, South Korea took place from September 4-October 27, 2013 at the Chungmu Art Hall. The opening night was September 23.
The U.K. premiere of the musical was staged at ArtsEd in Chiswick, London from January 17–25, 2014, with permission of MTI of New York. Mountview Academy of Theatre Arts presented the show at the Bernie Grant Arts Centre, Tottenham, London in early 2015.
The first North American regional production was held at the Ice House Theater in Visalia, CA in summer 2014, through Visalia Players.
The German premiere was staged at the Theater Bielefeld.
The Irish premiere was staged by University College Dublin in November 2014.
The Czech premiere was staged by J. K. Tyl Theatre in Plzeň in May 2016. Second Czech production was introduced as major production by Musical Theatre Karlín in Prague in October 2016.
The first high school production of the show was premiered at Vacaville High School on the 84th anniversary of the duo's death, May 23, 2018, in Vacaville, CA. 
Staged at the Mainline Theatre in Montreal, Quebec (Canada), Contact Theatre presented the English Montreal premiere in April 2019.
Bonnie & Clyde premiered in Antwerp, Belgium on 27 September 2019. The show was presented by BSO Productions and MusicalVibes and starred Charlotte Campion and Juan Gerlo in the title roles.
The Swedish premiere was staged in Eksjö in February 2020, starring Fanny Hugosson as Bonnie, and Mikael Sturesson as Clyde.
The Polish premiere was staged in Koszalin in September 2021, directed by Kacper Wojcieszek, starring Aleksandra Daukszewicz and Diana Gliniecka as Bonnie, Łukasz Walczak and Ringo Todorovic as Clyde.
The first Australian production was staged in Sydney in June 2022, produced by Hayes Theatre Co and Joshua Robson Productions, and starring Teagan Wouters and Blake Appelqvist in the title roles.
In February 2023 the Japanese all-female theater troupe Takarazuka Revue staged it at Misonoza theater in Nagoya with Snow Troupe top star Sakina Ayakaze as Clyde and top musumeyaku Aya Yumeshiro as Bonnie 
The first Brazilian production opened in March 2023 in an immersive venue.

Plot

Broadway production
Act I
Bonnie Parker and Clyde Barrow sit in a car, dead. ("Prologue"). In Depression-era West Texas, Bonnie is a 20-year-old diner waitress who dreams of a life in the movies. Young Bonnie is also onstage singing about the dream. Young Clyde sings about his dream to become a criminal, similar to Billy the Kid and Al Capone. ("Picture Show"). Clyde Barrow, who has just broken out of prison with his brother Buck, discovers Bonnie on the side of the road and a connection is made between the two dreamers as he repairs her car in exchange for a lift into Dallas ("This World Will Remember Me"). Meanwhile, Blanche Barrow urges her husband, Buck, to turn himself in and set things right with the Lord and with the law ("You're Goin' Back to Jail").
 Bonnie ends up spending the whole day, and several thereafter, with Clyde. She tells him of her grand plans: to be an actress, a poet and a singer. Clyde convinces her to sing him a song ("How 'Bout a Dance?") and assures her that together they'll make both their dreams - his of a life without having to worry about money, hers of fame - come true.

The two go to visit Buck. Clyde is overjoyed to see his brother again and they talk of driving away from Dallas in the latest Ford, which is said to be able to go 60 miles per hour ("When I Drive"). However, when Clyde hears of Buck's plan to turn himself in and complete his sentence, he is strongly opposed to the idea and leaves angrily. However, Clyde is eventually caught by Ted and the other authorities, while Buck turns himself in ("God's Arms Are Always Open"). In the jailhouse, Ted and Clyde reflect on their love for Bonnie ("You Can Do Better Than Him"). Bonnie professes her love for Clyde as Blanche does the same for Buck ("You Love Who You Love"). Buck is released quickly, while Clyde receives a much harsher jail sentence, and then faces a difficult time of continuous physical and sexual assault while in prison. At the peak of his abuse, Clyde turns to a makeshift weapon and performs his first murder ("Raise a Little Hell"). He convinces Bonnie to smuggle a gun into his cell, and Clyde again breaks out of prison, this time killing a deputy ("This World Will Remember Us").

 Act II
Bonnie and Clyde begin a life of crime, robbing stores and traveling all around to avoid being caught ("Made in America"). During a grocery store robbery gone wrong, Clyde shoots a deputy who was, in his words: 'trying to be a hero'. When she hears that Clyde has gone from robbery to murder, a frenzied Bonnie wants out ("Too Late to Turn Back Now") but realizes that she is too far from what she has known to go back. In part due to the grocery store shooting, the two achieve folk hero status throughout the country, with officers in every Southern state on the hunt for them. Clyde sends occasional letters to Buck and Blanche, telling them of the adventures and opportunities they have made on the road. Buck begins to see that there is more for them out there than can be found in their current situation, and he unsuccessfully tries to convince Blanche that they should join Clyde and Bonnie ("That's What You Call a Dream").

The infamous duo, meanwhile, continues on their robbery spree, growing increasingly bold in their endeavors ("What Was Good Enough for You") and graduating from stores to banks. In the midst of an unsuccessful bank robbery, Clyde is shot in the shoulder. Upon hearing of his brother's injury, Buck leaves home along with his wife, who is torn between her love for her husband and what she knows is right - to help Clyde. In the hideout, Clyde and Bonnie share a tender moment ("Bonnie") before being interrupted by Buck at the door. He is with a reluctant Blanche; her love for her husband won out in the end. Days later, Bonnie and Blanche nervously await the return of Clyde and Buck from a robbery ("Raise a Little Hell (reprise)"), as Blanche questions how Bonnie can happily live the way they do. Bonnie replies that she and Clyde are the only ones truly living life to the fullest ("Dyin' Ain't So Bad"). Buck and Clyde return, with their respective partners, elated to see them, but the celebration is short-lived as they learn that they have been followed by the authorities to the hideout. A shootout ensues, in which Buck is mortally wounded. Clyde quickly whisks Bonnie away, but a heartbroken Blanche stays with Buck until his dying breath and is arrested for aiding and abetting ("God's Arms Are Always Open (reprise)"). Ted reports back to the Sheriff, having been told by Bonnie's mother of Bonnie and Clyde's whereabouts, and they prepare to ambush the couple. A guilty Ted convinces himself he is doing the right thing ("You Can Do Better Than Him (reprise)").

In the woods on the way back to Dallas, Clyde wonders how his family will even be able to look at him after what he has done to Buck ("Picture Show (reprise)"). Bonnie assures him that it was not his fault, but both realize that they are nearing the end of their fateful journey ("Dyin' Ain't So Bad (reprise)" / "How 'Bout a Dance? (reprise)"). On May 23, 1934, on a rural Louisianan road, Bonnie and Clyde are ambushed and killed by police on the way to meet their parents. So therefore they were dead even after all the guilt they felt. We may never know if they would have changed their ways. Bonnie and Cylde were a very eventful couple who ended up paying the price in the end.

Musical numbers

 Act I
"Prologue" – Orchestra
"Picture Show" – Young Bonnie, Young Clyde, Bonnie, Clyde
"This World Will Remember Me" – Clyde, Bonnie
"You're Goin' Back to Jail" – Blanche, Buck, Salon Women
"How 'Bout a Dance?" – Bonnie
"When I Drive" – Clyde, Buck
"God's Arms Are Always Open" – Preacher, Blanche, Congregation
"You Can Do Better Than Him" – Ted, Clyde
"You Love Who You Love" – Bonnie, Blanche
"Raise a Little Hell" – Clyde
"This World Will Remember Us" – Clyde, Bonnie

 Act II
"Made in America" – Preacher, Ensemble
"Too Late to Turn Back Now" – Clyde, Bonnie
"That's What You Call a Dream" – Blanche
"What Was Good Enough For You" – Clyde, Bonnie
"Bonnie" – Clyde
"Raise a Little Hell (reprise)" – Clyde, Buck, Ted
"Dyin' Ain't So Bad" – Bonnie
"God's Arms Are Always Open (reprise)"† – Blanche, Preacher
"You Can Do Better Than Him (reprise)"† – Ted
"Picture Show (reprise)"† – Young Bonnie, Young Clyde
"Dyin' Ain't So Bad (reprise)" – Clyde, Bonnie
"How 'Bout a Dance? (reprise)" – Bonnie

†Not on the Original Broadway Cast Recording.

Casts
Below are the principal cast members of all major productions of Bonnie & Clyde to date.

Critical response

Regional

La Jolla 
The Los Angeles Times review complimented the leads, saying that Osnes "effectively works the red-headed moll temptress angle while Stark Sands' Clyde flaunts his ripped torso as often as possible. And both possess sharp musical instincts". The Wildhorn score "is undeniably impressive". Although it notes that "stylistically, the work seems beholden to conventional forms yet curious about modern breakthroughs... what is motivating the retelling of this story?"

Sarasota 
"Bonnie & Clyde opened Friday at the Asolo Repertory Theatre with a bang—actually quite a few deadly bangs—and by night's end proved worthy of all the buzz it has created...On balance, though, Bonnie & Clyde has all the markings of a musical bound for success on the Great White Way and should be mandatory viewing for all local theater enthusiasts". - Wade Tatangelo, Brandenton.com."There is much to recommend in this show about the two fame-obsessed Texas outlaws in the early 1930s. It boasts two star-making performances by Jeremy Jordan and Laura Osnes in the title roles, smooth and action-packed staging by Jeff Calhoun, an impressive set that also displays historic videos and photos, and a tune-filled score by Frank Wildhorn and lyricist Don Black". - Jay Handelman, Herald-Tribune.

Broadway
The opening night received mixed reviews. Roma Torre of NY 1 commented that the show "has many virtues but also enough flaws to keep it from blowing you away", while Thom Geir of Entertainment Weekly criticized the show, claiming it "aims for kiss-kiss-bang-bang, but too often it's just firing blanks". However, the two lead performers, Jeremy Jordan and Laura Osnes, received generally good reviews for their performances. Critic Ben Brantley of The New York Times stated that Jordan "exudes a naturally intense presence, and he works hard at making Clyde seem both wholesome and menacing" and that "Ms. Osnes is a lovely young woman of fashion-model proportions and an instinctive, accessible elegance that reads Ingénue," although he went on to add "I don’t think ingénue was what Bonnie Parker was about" and "Clyde, honey, t’ain’t nothing you can do to raise the pulse of something that’s as near to dead as the show you’re in." The cast and crew, as well as many of the production's supporters, expressed that they felt the critics had been biased due to Wildhorn's previous Broadway track record.

Recordings
An original Broadway cast album featuring all 20 musical numbers and a bonus track (the song "This Never Happened Before", which was cut during the show's early stages), was recorded on January 2, 2012, and released on April 24.

Selected songs from the musical were given jazz re-arrangements for a live performance by the Broadway cast at Feinstein's/54 Below; the recording was released on June 6, 2016, as the album Frank Wildhorn and Friends: Bonnie & Clyde and a Whole Lotta Jazz.

Awards and nominations

Broadway production

References

External links

Official Bonnie & Clyde Broadway website
Bonnie & Clyde at Broadway's Best Shows
Internet Broadway Database listing
Bonnie & Clyde, LaJolla Playhouse
Bonnie and Clyde at the Asolo Repertory Theater, Sarasota
Frank Wildhorn page on Bonnie & Clyde: A New Musical

2009 musicals
Broadway musicals
Musicals inspired by real-life events
Musicals about the Great Depression
Depictions of Bonnie and Clyde in music
Musicals by Frank Wildhorn
Musicals by Don Black (lyricist)